This is a list of Old West gunfights. Gunfights have left a lasting impression on American frontier history; many were retold and embellished by dime novels and magazines like Harper's Weekly during the late 19th and early 20th century. The most notable shootouts took place in Arizona, California, New Mexico, Kansas, Oklahoma, and Texas. Some like the Gunfight at the O.K. Corral were the outcome of long-simmering feuds and rivalries but most were the result of a confrontation between outlaws and law enforcement.

List

 Bellevue War, April 1, 1840, Bellevue, Iowa Territory
 Broderick–Terry duel, September 13, 1859, San Francisco, California
 Wild Bill Hickok–Davis Tutt shootout, July 21, 1865, Springfield, Missouri
 Gunfight at Hide Park, August 19, 1871, Newton, Kansas
 Goingsnake massacre, April 15, 1872, Tahlequah, Indian Territory
 Lampasas Gunfight, June 7, 1877, Lampasas, Texas
 Battle of Blazer's Mill, April 4, 1878, Mescalero, New Mexico Territory
 Battle of Lincoln, July 15–19, 1878, Lincoln, New Mexico Territory
 Long Branch Saloon Gunfight, April 5, 1879, Dodge City, Kansas
 Variety Hall Shootout, January 22, 1880, Las Vegas, New Mexico Territory
 Luke Short-Charlie Storms Gunfight, February 25, 1881, Tombstone, Arizona Territory
 Four Dead in Five Seconds Gunfight, April 14, 1881, El Paso, Texas
 Gunfight at the O.K. Corral, October 26, 1881, Tombstone, Arizona Territory
 Trinidad Gunfight, April 16, 1882, Trinidad, Colorado
 Vaudeville Theater Ambush, March 11, 1884, San Antonio, Texas
 Hunnewell, Kansas Gunfight, August 21, 1884, Hunnewell, Kansas
 Frisco shootout, December 1, 1884, Reserve, New Mexico Territory
 Tascosa Gunfight, March 21, 1886, Tascosa, Texas
 Luke Short-Jim Courtright Gunfight, February 8, 1887, Fort Worth, Texas
 Tewksbury's Ranch shootout, September 1887, Pleasant Valley, Arizona Territory
 Owens-Blevins Shootout, September 1887, Holbrook, Arizona Territory
 Tunnel Saloon Gabriel-Phy shootout, May 31, 1888, Florence, Arizona Territory
 Battle of Cimarron, January 12, 1889, Cimarron, Kansas
 Wham Paymaster robbery, May 11, 1889, near Fort Thomas, Arizona Territory
 Battle of Coffeyville, October 5, 1892, Coffeyville, Kansas
 Battle of Stone Corral, June 11–12, 1893, Visalia, California
 Battle of Tres Jacales, June 30, 1893, Tres Jacales, Chihuahua
 Battle of Ingalls, September 1, 1893, Ingalls, Indian Territory
 Skeleton Canyon shootout, August 12, 1896, Nogales, Arizona Territory
 Blackwell gunfight, December 4, 1896, Blackwell, Indian Territory
 Shootout on Juneau Wharf, July 8, 1898, Skagway, District of Alaska
 Hot Springs Gunfight, March 16, 1899, Hot Springs, Arkansas
 Columbus shootout, March 16, 1899, Columbus, Texas
 Shootout at Wilson Ranch, April 7, 1899, Pearce, Arizona Territory
 Fairbank train robbery, February 15, 1900, Fairbank, Arizona Territory
 Moab Shootout, May 26, 1900, Moab, Utah
 Battleground Gunfight, October 8, 1901, Fort Apache Indian Reservation, Arizona Territory
 Gunfight at Spokogee, September 22, 1902, Dustin, Indian Territory
 Canyon Diablo Shootout, April 8, 1905, Canyon Diablo, Arizona Territory
 Shootout in Benson, February 27, 1907, Benson, Arizona Territory
 Naco Gunfight, April 5, 1908, Naco, Sonora
 Shootout at Sonoratown, May 15, 1911, near Ray, Arizona Territory
 Gleeson Gunfight, March 5, 1917, Gleeson, Arizona
 Power's Cabin Shootout, February 10, 1918, Galiuro Mountains, Arizona

See also
List of cowboys and cowgirls
List of Western lawmen
List of Old West gunfighters

Old West gunfights
Old West